The Ministry of Labour and Pension System, Family and Social Policy of the Republic of Croatia is the ministry in the Government of Croatia which performs administrative and other tasks related to employment policy, regulation of labor relations, labor market and active employment policy, system and policy of pension insurance and relations with trade unions and employers associations in the area of employment relations.

List of ministers

Ministers of Labour and Social Welfare (1990–2003)

From 23 December 2003 to 23 December 2011 the Ministry of Labour and Social Welfare was split and divided between two ministries. The social welfare portfolio was merged with Ministry of Health and labour portfolio was merged with Ministry of Economy.

After 23 December 2011 there are two ministries, one for Labour and one for Social Policies.

Ministers of Labour and Pension System (2011–2020)

Ministers of Labour and Pension System, Family and Social Policy (2020–present)

Notes
 nb 1.   Served as Minister of Labour, Veteran and Disability Issues
nb 2.  Served as Minister of Labour, Social Welfare and Family
nb 3.  Served as Minister of Labour and Social Welfare

References

External links 
 

Labour and Pension System
Ministries established in 1990
1990 establishments in Croatia